Rayevo is a rural locality (a village) and the administrative centre of Rayevsky Selsoviet, Davlekanovsky District, Bashkortostan, Russia. The population was 314 as of 2010. There are 4 streets.

Geography 
Rayevo is located 19 km southeast of Davlekanovo (the district's administrative centre) by road. Ayukhanovo is the nearest rural locality.

References 

Rural localities in Davlekanovsky District